Jorge Iván Ospina (born October 1965 in Santiago de Cali, Colombia) is a former Colombian Senator and current mayor of Santiago de Cali, the third largest city in Colombia and the economic hub for Southwestern Colombia. Ospina is also a doctor who has worked in the hospital of the University of Valle, known as the Hospital Universitario del Valle Evaristo Garcia. Ospina's father, Ivan Marino Ospina, was a guerrilla fighter and co-founder of the revolutionary group 19th of April Movement (M-19). Mayor Ospina was sworn in on January 1st 2019 and will be in seat until January 1st 2024.

Election
Ospina defeated Francisco Lloreda in the Colombian elections, which were held on October 28th, 2007. Ospina won with 44% of the vote, leaving Lloreda with 39%, and the other 17% being distributed amongst the other 6 candidates.

References

1965 births
Living people
People from Cali
Colombian people of Basque descent